Culver City is a city in Los Angeles County, California, United States. As of the 2020 census, the population was 40,779. The city boasts the "third-most diverse school district in California" in 2020. 

In the 1920s, the city became a center for film and later television production, best known as the home of Metro-Goldwyn-Mayer studios. From 1932 to 1986, it was the headquarters for the Hughes Aircraft Company. National Public Radio West and Sony Pictures Entertainment have headquarters in the city. The city was named after its founder, Harry Culver. It is mostly surrounded by the city of Los Angeles, but also shares a border with the unincorporated area of Ladera Heights.

History

Early history 
Archaeological evidence suggests a human presence in the area of present-day Culver City since at least 8000 BC. The region was the homeland of the Tongva-Gabrieliño Native Americans. For centuries, native people lived in areas currently part of and surrounding Culver City. California's native people were massacred by waves of Spanish, Mexican and Euro-American invaders through a combination of slavery, disease, relocation, forced labor, imprisonment, broken treaties and a genocidal war of extermination, including paid bounties for dead "Indians".
The Spanish and Mexican governments offered concessions and land grants from 1785 to 1846 forming the Ranchos of California. Culver City was founded on the lands of the former Rancho La Ballona and Rancho Rincon de los Bueyes. When Culver City was founded, native, Hispanic or Latino people were not allowed to buy property.

During the American Civil War U.S. Army post called Camp Latham was established from 1861 to 1862 on the south bank of Ballona Creek, near Overland Avenue.

Culver City 

Harry Culver first attempted to establish Culver City in 1913. It was officially incorporated on September 20, 1917, and named after its founder. The area benefited from pre-existing transportation links; Culver's first ads read "All roads lead to Culver City". While this slogan might seem welcoming to all, the city was explicitly founded as a whites-only sundown town, as were most of the suburbs and towns outside the downtown and Central Avenue districts of Los Angeles. Culver ran ads promoting "this model little white city", while his close associate, Guy M. Rush, promoted lot sales "restricted to Caucasian race". The city also at times excluded people of non-Christian religious faiths.

The weekly Culver City Call was the first newspaper in the community. The paper was founded in 1915.

The first film studio in Culver City was built by Thomas Ince in 1918 for The Triangle Motion Picture Company. Silent film comedy producer Hal Roach built his studios there in 1919, and Metro Goldwyn Mayer (MGM) took over the Triangle studio complex in 1924. During Prohibition, speakeasies and nightclubs such as the Cotton Club lined Washington Boulevard.

Culver Center, one of Southern California's first shopping malls, was completed in 1950 on Venice Boulevard near the Overland Avenue intersection. Many other retail stores, including a Rite Aid and several banks and restaurants, have occupied the center since then.

Hughes Aircraft Company 
Hughes Aircraft opened its Culver City plant in July 1941. There the company built the H-4 Hercules transport (commonly called the "Spruce Goose"). Hughes was also an active subcontractor during World War II. It developed and patented a flexible feed chute for faster loading of machine guns on B-17 bombers, and manufactured electric booster drives for machine guns. Hughes produced more ammunition belts than any other American manufacturer, and built 5,576 wings and 6,370 rear fuselage sections for Vultee BT-13 trainers.

Hughes grew after the war, and in 1953 Howard Hughes donated all his stock in the company to the Howard Hughes Medical Institute. After he died in 1976, the institute sold the company, which made it the second-best-endowed medical research foundation in the world.

The studios (1960s, 1970s and 1980s) 

The Hal Roach Studios were demolished in 1963. In the late 1960s, much of the MGM backlot acreage (lot 3 and other property on Jefferson Boulevard), and the nearby  known as RKO Forty Acres, once owned by RKO Pictures and later Desilu Productions, were sold by their owners. In 1976 the sets were razed to make way for redevelopment. Today, the RKO site is the southern expansion of the Hayden Industrial Tract, while the MGM property has been converted into a subdivision and a shopping center known as Raintree Plaza.

Rebirth of downtown (1990s and 2000s) 
In the early 1990s, Culver City launched a successful revitalization program in which it renovated its downtown as well as several shopping centers in the Sepulveda Boulevard corridor near Westfield Culver City. Around the same time, Sony's motion picture subsidiaries, Columbia Pictures and TriStar Pictures, moved into the Lorimar Studios lot which was renamed Columbia Studios in 1990 and took on its current name, Sony Pictures Studios, a year later.

There was an influx of art galleries and restaurants on the eastern part of the city, which was formally designated the Culver City Art District.

Geography 

The city is surrounded by the Los Angeles neighborhoods of Mar Vista and Palms to the north; Westchester to the south; Mid-City, West Adams, and Baldwin Hills to the east; the Ladera Heights unincorporated area to the southeast; and the L.A. neighborhoods of Venice and Playa Vista to the west, along with the unincorporated area of Marina Del Rey.

Culver City's major geographic feature is Ballona Creek, which runs northeast to southwest through most of the city before it drains into Santa Monica Bay in Marina Del Rey.

Neighborhoods 
The city recognizes 15 neighborhoods within city limits.

 Blair Hills
 Blanco-Culver Crest
 Clarkdale
 Culver West
 Downtown Culver City
 Fox Hills
 Jefferson
 Lucerne-Higuera
 McLaughlin
 McManus
 Park East (also known as Carlson Park)
 Park West (also known as Veterans Park)
 Studio Village
 Sunkist Park
 Washington Culver

Climate 

Source 3 = Bestplaces.net

Demographics

Ethnic groups 
According to the 2020 Census, the 5 largest ethnic groups in Culver City, CA are White (Non-Hispanic) (46.5%), Asian (Non-Hispanic) (16.1%), White (Hispanic) (15.2%), Black or African American (Non-Hispanic) (8.24%), and Other (Hispanic) (5.57%).

Economy 

Corporations with headquarters in Culver City include Beats Audio, MedMen, NantHealth, Sweetgreen and Sony Pictures Entertainment.

Largest employers
According to the city's 2020–21 Comprehensive Annual Financial Report, the top employers in the city were:

Movie and television production 

Hundreds of movies have been produced on the lots of Culver City's studios: Sony Pictures Studios (originally MGM Studios), Culver Studios, and the former Hal Roach Studios.  In 2017, Amazon Studios announced plans to build a studio in Culver City.

Businesses 
Westfield Culver City, a shopping mall.
Beats Electronics
Disney Digital Network
MedMen
NPR West
Sony Pictures Studios
The Ripped Bodice, the only romance novel bookstore in the northern hemisphere

Arts and culture

Museums 
The Wende Museum possesses a collection of Soviet and East German visual art and everyday artifacts to promote an understanding of Soviet art, history and culture between 1945 and 1991.

Library 
The County of Los Angeles Public Library operates the Julian Dixon Culver City Branch.

Architecture 
The architecture of Culver City reflects its history as an early location for film studios and, more recently, as a site for architectural experimentation, particularly for the projects of Eric Owen Moss at the Hayden Tract. The architecture office of Morphosis headquartered here. Styles represented include Mission Revival and Colonial Revival from the city's early days, to the PWA Moderne of the 1930s, to modern, postmodern, and deconstructivist styles from the past few decades. Notable architectural landmarks include:

 Ivy Substation (1907), a Mission Revival building that houses The Actors' Gang 
 Culver Studios (1918-1920), offices in the style of a Colonial Revival mansion
 Culver Hotel (Curlett and Beelman, 1924), a six-story brick flatiron 

 Helms Bakery (1930), in PWA Moderne style
 Kirk Douglas Theatre (1946)
 St. Augustine Catholic Church (1957), a Gothic Revival church
 Platform (2016)

Parks and recreation 

The City of Culver City Parks and Recreation department operates 14 outdoor parks within city limits.

Government 

Culver City has a five-member city council.

In Los Angeles County, Culver City is in the 2nd Supervisorial District, represented by Holly Mitchell.

Education

Primary and secondary schools 
The Culver City Unified School District administers the following public schools:

 Culver City High School
 Culver City Middle School
 Culver City Unified School District iAcademy
 Culver Park High School
 El Marino Elementary School
 El Rincon Elementary School
 Farragut Elementary School
 La Ballona Elementary School
 Linwood E. Howe Elementary School

Private schools
 STAR Prep Academy, a middle and high school that shares its campus with an exotic wildlife rescue center.
 The Willows Community School (elementary and middle school).
 Turning Point School (elementary and middle school).
 Kayne Eras Center (school for disabled).
 Wildwood School (primary through high school).
 Echo Horizon School (primary through middle school).

Colleges and universities 
Antioch University Los Angeles, a nonprofit liberal arts college in Culver City's Corporate Pointe district.

Media

Newspaper
 Culver City Call

Movies

Movies filmed or partially filmed in Culver City include:

 The Wizard of Oz 
 The Thin Man 
 Gone with the Wind 
 Rebecca 
 Tarzan 
 King Kong 
 Grease 
 Raging Bull 
 E.T. the Extra-Terrestrial 
 The Man with Two Brains 
 City Slickers 
 Air Force One 
 Wag the Dog 
 Contact 
 Pee-wee's Big Adventure 
 Tron 
 Bewitched 
 Fun with Dick and Jane 
 Get Shorty 
 Superbad 
 Killers 
 Dinner for Schmucks 
 Lincoln Lawyer 
 Moneyball 
 Horrible Bosses 
 Jack and Jill 
 Think Like a Man 
 The Campaign

Television shows

Television shows filmed or partially filmed in Culver City include:

 Jeopardy!
 Las Vegas
 Gunsmoke
 Cougar Town
 Mad About You
 Lassie
 Hogan's Heroes
 Batman
 The Green Hornet
 Arrested Development
 The Andy Griffith Show
 Gomer Pyle, U.S.M.C.
 The Nanny
 Hell's Kitchen
 MasterChef
 Wheel of Fortune
 Tosh. O
 The Wonder Years
 CHiPs
 Matchstick Men
 The Hogan Family

Infrastructure

Transportation

Transit

The Culver City station of the Los Angeles Metro E Line sits at the Culver Junction near Venice and Robertson Boulevards in Culver City. The E Line provides a light rail connection from Culver City to Downtown Los Angeles to the east and Downtown Santa Monica to the west, mostly following the right-of-way that the Pacific Electric Santa Monica Air Line used, also known as the Exposition Boulevard line. Culver City station was the western terminus of what was then known as the Expo Line from its opening on June 20, 2012, to the opening of Expo Line phase two on May 20, 2016.

Culver CityBus was founded on March 4, 1928, making it the second oldest municipal bus line in California and the oldest public transit bus system still operating in Los Angeles County. Big Blue Bus was founded on April 14, 1928. Culver CityBus operates seven regular bus lines as well as a short-term downtown circulator shuttle. 

The Culver City Transit Center in the Westfield Culver City parking serves as a bus depot for three Culver CityBus lines and two Metro bus lines. The Washington Fairfax Hub, just across the border of the City of Los Angeles under the I-10 freeway, connects residents to seven bus lines, two operated by Culver CityBus and five operated by Metro. 

The Baldwin Hills Parklands Link is a shuttle service operated by Los Angeles County that stops at Stoneview Nature Center on weekends only.

Bike routes

The city is served by multiple separated bike paths:
 Culver Boulevard Median bike route
 Ballona Creek bike path, connecting to the Park to Playa Trail
 Elenda Street bikeway, 12-block route between Ballona Creek Pedestrian Bridge and Washington Boulevard
 Separated bike and bus lanes through downtown Culver City, part of the MoveCulverCity complete streets initiative

Air travel
Smaller nearby airports include Santa Monica Airport and Hawthorne Municipal Airport.

Freeways
Culver City is served by Interstate 405 (San Diego Freeway), Interstate 10 (Santa Monica Freeway), and California State Route 90 (Marina Freeway).

Public safety
Culver City is served by the Culver City Police Department, and the Culver City Fire Department, which operates three stations and a fire training facility.

Cemeteries  
Hillside Memorial Park Cemetery
Holy Cross Cemetery

Notable people

Art Alexakis, musician, founder and lead singer of the band Everclear
Drew Barrymore, actress
Shayla Beesley, actress
Big Boy, radio host
Jack Black, actor
Jackson Browne, singer, songwriter, and musician
Michael Bumpus, NFL player, Seattle Seahawks
Gary Carter, Major League Baseball player, Hall of Famer
Michael Chacon, professional fixed-gear bike rider
Tiffany Cohen, double-gold champion in swimming at the 1984 Summer Olympics
 Glenn Cowan (1952–2004), table tennis player
Dee Dee Davis, actress
Jeff Fisher, NFL coach
Tim Foli, Major League Baseball player
Dick Gautier, actor
Kron Gracie, son of Rickson Gracie, teaches Brazilian Jiu Jitsu in town
Linda Gray, film, stage, and television actress, director, and producer
Charles Herbert, actor
Win Headley, NFL and CFL player
Kelly Lytle Hernández, Professor and Thomas E. Lifka Chair of History at UCLA, author of several books, and MacArthur Fellowship recipient
Howard Hughes, founder of Hughes Aircraft
Helen Hunt, Oscar-winning actress
HuskyStarcraft, aka Mike Lamond, YouTube commentator
Darrin Jackson, Major League Baseball player and MLB sportscaster
Taran Killam, actor and comedian
Tim Layana, Major League Baseball player
Merry Lepper, set world record marathon time for women, December 16, 1963, in Culver City.
Masiela Lusha, Albanian-American actress and poet
Ron Mael, musician, member of Sparks
Bill Monning, California State Senator
Michael Richards, actor and comedian
Michelle Horn, actress
Michael Ruppert, journalist and former LAPD officer
Ryan Sherriff, Major League Baseball player
Dick Stuart, Major League Baseball player
Robert Trujillo, bass player with Suicidal Tendencies, Ozzy Osbourne, and Metallica
Gwen Verdon, four-time Tony Award-winning actress

Sister cities 

 Capo d'Orlando, Messina, Sicily, Italy
 Iksan, South Korea
 Kaizuka, Japan
 Lethbridge, Alberta, Canada
 Uruapan, Michoacán, Mexico

See also 

 Westside (Los Angeles County)

References

External links 

 

 
1913 establishments in California
Cities in Los Angeles County, California
Incorporated cities and towns in California
Populated places established in 1913
Westside (Los Angeles County)
Sundown towns in California